The Battle of Fornham was a battle fought during the Revolt of 1173–74.

Background
The Revolt began in April 1173 and resulted from the efforts of King Henry II of England to find lands for his youngest son, Prince John. John's other three legitimate brothers – Henry, Richard, and Geoffrey – objected and fled to the court of King Louis VII of France, where they raised a rebellion. The rebelling sons and the French king secured a number of allies and invaded Normandy, while the Scottish king invaded England. These invasions failed and although negotiations between the rebels and the English king were started, they resulted in no peace. Robert de Beaumont, the Earl of Leicester, then decided to invade England with a force of Flemish mercenaries. He landed at Walton in Suffolk in late September or early October.

Leicester attempted to join forces with another rebel, Hugh Bigod, the Earl of Norfolk, who was based at the castle of Framlingham. After some inconclusive fighting, Leicester decided to lead his men to his own base of Leicester, but royalist forces prevented this. The earl's base there had recently come under attack by royal forces and thus needed reinforcement, but another reason for the movement may have been friction between de Beaumont and Bigod and Bigod's wife, Gundreda.

Battle
The battle was fought on 17 October 1173 between rebel forces under the command of Leicester and royal forces under the command of Richard de Lucy, the Chief Justiciar as well as Humphrey de Bohun Lord High Constable, Reginald de Dunstanville, the Earl of Cornwall, William of Gloucester, the Earl of Gloucester, and William d'Aubigny, the Earl of Arundel. The rebel forces were numbered at 3000 mercenaries, and the royal forces included at least 300 knights as well as the Earl of Norfolk's son, Roger Bigod, who had remained loyal to the king. Along with these knights, the royal forces also had the local levies and the military followings of three earls of Gloucester, Arundel, and Cornwall.

With his forces split, Leicester's cavalry was captured and his mercenaries were driven into nearby swamps where the local peasants killed most of them. Leicester was captured, as was his wife, Petronilla de Grandmesnil, who had put on armour herself.

Aftermath
Leicester remained in captivity until January 1177 when some of his lands were returned to him.

Citations

References

 
 
  

1173 in England
Conflicts in 1173
Military history of Suffolk
Battles involving England